Lourdes Domínguez Lino was the defending champion, but lost in the semifinals to Tathiana Garbin.

Seeds

Draw

Finals

Top half

Bottom half

External links
Main Draw and Qualifying Draw

2007 Copa Colsanitas Singles
Copa Colsanitas Singles